Vrbnica may refer to:
 Vrbnica, Slovakia, a village and municipality in Slovakia
 Vrbnica, Foča, a village in Bosnia and Herzegovina
 Vrbnica river, Montenegro
 Vrbnica (Aleksandrovac), a village in Rasina District, central Serbia
 Vrbnica (Malo Crniće), a village in Braničevo District, eastern Serbia
 Vrbnica (Sjenica), a village in Zlatibor District, southwestern Serbia

See also 
 
 Vrabnitsa
 Vrbica (disambiguation)